Grivița is a district of Bucharest, Romania, centered on the Grivița Railway Yards (Atelierele CFR Grivița), which were and still are an important landmark within the manufacturing landscape of the city. Located near Gara de Nord, their history dates back to the late decades of the 19th century, when they were developed in order to perform maintenance and overhaul of railway equipment serving Căile Ferate Române.

The name reflects the Romanian spelling for Grivitsa, a village near Pleven, where one of the Ottoman redoubts in the Plevna's defenses was stormed and captured with heavy casualties by the Romanian Army during the Romanian War of Independence (see Siege of Plevna). In honor of this victory, Calea Târgoviștei, a street in Bucharest that led to the road that connected the capital with the city of Târgoviște, is renamed Calea Griviței. 

What initially started only to serve the city of Bucharest and the surrounding areas, grew over time into a cornerstone of the entire railway industry of Romania. In the interwar period, after the start of the Great Depression in Romania, Grivița Railway Yards also become a focal point of the labor movement. The Grivița Strike of 1933 and its violent repression by the authorities are still remembered in Romania.

During the communist regime, their name was changed to Grivița Roșie ("Red Grivița"), in memory of the 1933 events. The area surrounding the Yards, one of the oldest of the city of Bucharest, became known as Cartierul Grivița ("Grivița Borough"), populated by the workers of Grivița Railway Yards. To this day it remains a blue collar neighborhood.

Districts of Bucharest
Rail transport in Romania